Small integral membrane protein (SMIM) 20 is a protein that in humans is encoded by the SMIM20 gene. SMIM20 acts as a prohormone to the peptide hormone phoenixin which was discovered for the first time in 2013 in rodent sensory ganglia.

In the study of the evolution of nervous systems, SMIM20 together with NUCB2 have been found to have deep homology across all lineages that preceded creatures with central nervous systems, bilaterians, cnidarians, ctenophores, and sponges as well as in choanoflagellates.

References

Further reading 

Genes
Human proteins